José Ernesto Gil Elorduy (born 18 September 1943) is a Mexican politician affiliated with the Institutional Revolutionary Party. As of 2014 he served as Senator of the LVIII and LIX Legislatures of the Mexican Congress representing Hidalgo and as Deputy of the LI and LV Legislature.

References

1943 births
Living people
Politicians from Hidalgo (state)
Members of the Senate of the Republic (Mexico)
Members of the Chamber of Deputies (Mexico)
Institutional Revolutionary Party politicians
21st-century Mexican politicians
Politicians from Mexico City
National Autonomous University of Mexico alumni
20th-century Mexican politicians
Members of the Congress of Hidalgo